This is a timeline of Adelaide history.

Prior to 1800s 
The Kaurna peoples' traditional lands stretched from Port Broughton to Cape Jervis, encompassing the Adelaide Plains.

1800s

1830s
 1834: South Australia Act 1834 (the "Foundation Act") passed on 15 August 1834, providing a legal framework and funds for the British colonisation of South Australia.
 1834: The South Australian Lodge of Friendship No. 613 was founded 22 October. The Lodge held its first meeting at 7 John Street, Adelphi, London.
 1836: Letters Patent erect and establish the Province of South Australia on 19 February 1836. It was to be Australia's second free colony and the first experiment of the Wakefieldian systematic colonization theory.
 1836: Tent city set up by the South Australian Company on the site now known as Kingscote on Kangaroo Island.
 1836: Site spanning the River Torrens is chosen for Adelaide by Colonel William Light in December 1836. Governor John Hindmarsh, aboard , lands at Holdfast Bay and proclaims the commencement of South Australia's colonial government on 28 December.
 1837: Colonel Light designs the plan for the city of Adelaide and completes the city survey. One-acre allotments are made, first to holders of land orders and then by auction. The city's first hospital is opened on North Terrace.
 1838: The South Australia Police, the first police force in Australia, is formed in Adelaide under Henry Inman. The first German immigrants arrive and settle in Klemzig, Hahndorf and surrounds.
 1839: Colonel Light dies on 6 October at Thebarton and is interred in Light Square – a memorial will be built over the grave.
 1839: Port Road opens as the first road built in South Australia.
 Late 1830s: The first stone house in Adelaide is built by William Austin Barnes on the corner of Morphett and Grote streets.

1840s 
1840: The first portion of Government House is completed, becoming the first in Australia.  The Corporation of Adelaide is founded as the first municipal authority in Australia, and James Hurtle Fisher is elected mayor.  An agricultural show, which will become the Royal Adelaide Show, is first held in the yard of Fordham's Hotel in Grenfell Street.
1841: Construction begins of Adelaide Gaol, and the first section is completed.  The Adelaide Hospital (later Royal) is opened.
1843: The first Legislative Council building is opened on North Terrace.
1844: 22 April: Intervention of the police in a dispute between the Kaurna and Moorundie in the West Parklands and destruction of the aboriginal weapons. Considered the end-point of Kaurna culture in Adelaide.
1845: 2 January: Death by tuberculosis in Adelaide of Mullawirraburka, known as "King John", Kaurna elder who learned English, taught aboriginal lore and helped the early colonists.
1844: The colonial Government takes control of the Corporation of Adelaide.
1847: St Peter's College is established. Pulteney Grammar School is established. 
1848: The Savings Bank of South Australia begins trading from a room in Gawler Place.
1849: City Commissioners are nominated to manage Adelaide.

1850s
1850: G. P. Harris and J. C. Lanyon, the forerunner to Harris Scarfe, opens on Hindley Street.
1851: Responsible Government is introduced to South Australia, enfranchising wealthy male colonists.
1852: The Corporation of Adelaide is reconstituted and James Hurtle Fisher again becomes mayor. The first overland transport of gold arrives in Adelaide.
1853: The first four local governing bodies in South Australia (apart from the Corporation of Adelaide) established as the district councils of Mitcham, East Torrens, Onkaparinga and Hindmarsh, following the passing of the 1852 'Act to appoint District Councils'. 
1853: Philosophical Society of Adelaide founded (later becoming the Royal Society of South Australia).
1855: Private telegraph line Adelaide–Port Adelaide installed by James Macgeorge
1856: The South Australian Institute is founded, from which will derive the State Library, State Museum and Art Gallery.
1856: Government telegraph line Adelaide–Port Adelaide installed by Charles Todd
1856: Steam railway between Adelaide and Port Adelaide opened.
1857: Adelaide Botanic Gardens opens at today's site in the Park Lands off North Terrace with George William Francis as the first director. Railway between Adelaide and Gawler was opened.
1858: The Melbourne-Adelaide telegraph line is opened.
1859: 3–8 February: devastating fires in the Adelaide Hills around Cox's Creek near Bridgewater.
1859: A jetty more than 350 metres in length is constructed at Glenelg.  It has a wooden lighthouse at its end, which will later be destroyed by fire.
1859: The Norwood Town Hall was built on the Parade at Norwood. It was the first Town Hall in South Australia.

1860s
1860: 29 February: the Agricultural and Horticultural Exhibition, the "Adelaide Autumn Show", takes place for the first time in a specially constructed building adjacent to North Terrace. 
1860: Thorndon Park Reservoir supplied water through new reticulation system.
1861: East Terrace markets opened.
1863: First gas supplied to city.
1865: Bank of Adelaide founded.
1866: The Italianate Adelaide Town Hall opened.
1867: Prince Alfred, Duke of Edinburgh, made first royal visit to Adelaide. Gas Street Lights first appear on Adelaide streets.
1868: 10 February: Major fire at D. & W. Murray's, drapery, King William Street
1869: The City Market (later Central) opened on Grote Street.
1869: The Brighton Town Hall was built on Brighton Road, Hove.

1870s
1870: Port Adelaide Football Club established.
1871: Nimble Ninepence store destroyed by fire and exploding stocks of gunpowder
1872: The General Post Office opened. Adelaide became first Australian capital linked to Imperial London with completion of the Overland Telegraph.
1873: First cricket match played at Adelaide Oval.
1874: The Adelaide Oval officially opened. The University of Adelaide founded.
1875: 18 April: Major fire at Townsend Duryea's photographic studios, King William Street
1876: Adelaide Children's Hospital founded.
1877: The Adelaide Bridge across the Torrens completed.
1878: First horse-drawn trams in Australia commenced operations in the city. Port Adelaide railway extended to Semaphore.
1879: Foundation stone of the University of Adelaide laid.

1880s
1880: Telephone introduced.
1880: Royal Society of South Australia received royal patronage.
1881: The Art Gallery of South Australia opened by Prince Albert Victor. Ornamental Torrens Lake created following construction of weir.
1882: 12 March: Major fire at James Marshall & Co., drapers of Rundle Street
1882: First water-borne sewerage service in Australia commenced. The City Baths opened on King William Street.
1883: Adelaide Zoological Gardens opened.
1883: Roseworthy Agricultural College established, the first agricultural college in Australia.
1884: 6 January: Major fire at Academy of Music on Rundle Street
1884: Adelaide Trades and Labor Council inaugurated. Fort Largs opened.
1884: Grand Lodge of South Australia Established. 16 April with 30 Lodges and 2064 members.
1884: 15 November: Major fire at Patrick Gay's cabinetmaking workshop and showroom, Rundle Street
1885: The Adelaide Arcade opened. Flinders Column erected at the Mount Lofty Summit.
1885: 16 December: Major fire at W. H. Burford & Son's soap and candle factory, Sturt Street
1887: The Intercolonial Express starts running between Adelaide and Melbourne. Stock Exchange of Adelaide formed.
1889: School of Mines and Industries opened on North Terrace.
1889: Central Adelaide Mosque opened

1890s
1890: Adelaide's first public statue, Venus, is unveiled on North Terrace.
1893: The Australian Association for the Advancement of Science meets in Adelaide – credit is universally accorded to Colonel Light for his selection of the site and for the design of Adelaide.
1894: 'Constitutional Amendment (Adult Suffrage) Act 1894, the world's second Act granting women suffrage and the first granting women the right to stand for parliament is passed in Parliament House on North Terrace.
1895: 24 July: Major fire at W. Menz & Co. confectioners, Wakefield Street opposite fire station
1896: Moving pictures are shown for first time in South Australia at Theatre Royal on Hindley Street. Happy Valley Reservoir is opened.
1899: The South Australian contingent left Adelaide for the Second Boer War.

1900s

Early 1900s
1900: First electricity station opened in South Australia at Grenfell Street. Electric street lights first appear.
1900: 4 December: Major fire at Alfred Stump's photographic studios, King William Street
1901: Adelaide became a state capital upon the establishment of the Commonwealth of Australia on 1 January.
1901: 6 April: Major fire at John Martin & Co. Ltd., retail store, Rundle Street
1901: 9–15 July: Official visit of the Duke and Duchess of Cornwall and York, Royal yacht Ophir.
1904: Adelaide Fruit and Produce Exchange opened in the East End.
1907: 5 February 1907 Harrold, Colton & Co. (became Colton, Palmer & Preston Ltd.), Currie Street
1907: 25 December: Major fire at W. H. Burford & Son's soap making factory, Hindmarsh
1908: Outer Harbor opened. Adelaide High School established.
1909: Electric tram services began.

1910s
1910: 16 November: Major fire at Genders Building, Grenfell Street (on Hindmarsh Square corner)
1912: The Verco Building, an early 'skyscraper', is built on North Terrace.
1913: The first metropolitan abattoir opens.
1913: 23 November: Major fire at Lion Timber Mills, Franklin Street
1914: Planting of first memorial to the Great War, the Wattle Day League War Memorial Oak.
1915: Australasia's first national Gallipoli Memorial established in the Adelaide Park Lands, 7 September 1915 – the Australian Wattle Day League's Gallipoli Memorial Wattle Grove with its centrepiece  'Australasian Soldiers Dardanelles 25 April 1915' obelisk (now known as the Dardanelles Cenotaph)
1915: Liquor bars close at 6 pm following a referendum.
1917: German private schools are closed. The first trains travel to Perth following completion of the East-West continental railway.
1919: 2 February: Major fire at W. H. Burford & Son's soap and candle factory, Sturt Street
1919: Mayor Charles Richmond Glover becomes the first Lord Mayor.

1920s
1920: 12–16 July: Royal Visit of the Prince of Wales
1923: 21 February: Major fire at Duncan & Fraser Ltd and Duncan's Motors Ltd., Ford importers.
1924: Radio broadcasting begins.
1924: 26 April: Major fire aboard steamer City of Singapore at Port Adelaide
1924: 10 November: Major fire at Richards Building, Chrysler body builders, importers Currie Street
1925: The Wayville Showgrounds open.
1926: 1 January: Major fire at Adelaide Fruit and Produce Exchange, East End Market.
1926: 24 February: Major fire at Colonial Sugar Refinery works at Glanville.
1927: The North–South railway is extended. The Duke and Duchess of York visit.
1928: 2000 special constables sworn in to break a strike of dock workers. The volunteer "Citizen's Defence Brigade" had been brought in and armed to fight striking port workers, and they were housed in a camp dubbed the "scab compound".
1929: The electric tram service to Glenelg commences.

1930s
1931: The Beef Riot: 17 people are injured when unemployed men clash with police while protesting the decision to remove beef from the dole ration.
1932: Local government is overhauled when Government redefines boundaries and names and abolishes others.
1933: First John Martin's Christmas Pageant.
1935: Many German place names, which had been changed during the Great War, are restored.
1935: 28 April: Major fire at Thompson & Harvey Ltd., paint, glass and wallpaper merchants, Flinders Street
1936: Centennial Park Cemetery opens. Grand celebrations are held to celebrate South Australia's Centenary.
1936: 11 August: Major fire at Torrenside Woollen Mills, Taylor's Road (now South Road), West Thebarton
1937: First trolley bus services commence. First permanent traffic signals are installed. Mount Bold Reservoir is opened. Outbreak of poliomyelitis.
1938: South Australian Housing Trust completes first dwelling.
1938: 19 January: Major fire at People's Palace, (Salvation Army hostel) Pirie Street
1938: 9 June: Major fire at Adelaide Stock Exchange call room
1939:The second worst heat wave is recorded with disastrous bushfires and highest Adelaide temperature of 46.1° Celsius. New Parliament House is opened on North Terrace by Governor-General Lord Gowrie. Carrick Hill, home to Edward (later Sir Edward) and Ursula Hayward, is completed.
1939: 14 December: Major fire at Lion Timber Mills, Port Adelaide

1940s
1940: Birkenhead Bridge opened. Second industry rapidly expanded throughout Adelaide region and South Australia at large as the war-effort intensified.
1940: 21 October: Major fire at Dunlop Perdriau Rubber Co, Flinders Street
1942: Rationing of tea and clothing introduced. Racesport and bookmaking banned.
1943: Rationing of butter introduced. Racing re-allowed.
1944: Rationing of meat introduced.
1945: Gas and electricity restrictions imposed.
1947: Orchards ripped up following discovery of fruit fly in the metropolitan area.
1948: 2 March: Major fire at Charles Moore & Co.'s retail store, Victoria Square
1948: Glenelg jetty destroyed and widespread damage caused by severe storms. Clothing and meat rationing abolished. Holden began production.

1950s
1950: Petrol, butter and tea rationing abolished.
1954: Adelaide was hit by a severe earthquake on 1 March. Queen Elizabeth II made first sovereign visit to Adelaide. Mannum–Adelaide pipeline completed, pumping water from the River Murray to metropolitan reservoirs. The Queen Elizabeth Hospital, located in western suburb of Woodville South, opens.
1955: Black Sunday bushfires destroy the Governor's summer residence at Marble Hill.
1955: Adelaide Airport at West Beach opened. Satelitte city of Elizabeth officially proclaimed. Redhen railcars make their first appearance on Adelaide's suburban rail network.
1958: Queen Elizabeth, the Queen Mother, visited Adelaide. First parking meters installed. South Para Reservoir opened and connected to Adelaide water supply. Last street tram removed, leaving only the Glenelg tram line.
1959: Television broadcasting commenced, with NWS-9.

1960s
1960: First Adelaide Festival of Arts held.
1962: Myponga Reservoir opened and connected to Happy Valley Reservoir.
1963: Port Stanvac oil refinery began operations. Queen Elizabeth II visited.
1964: Record wind gust of 148 kilometres per hour noted in Adelaide.
1966: Flinders University opened at Bedford Park by the Queen Mother. Happy Valley Reservoir pipelines extended.
1967: Wowserism goes into decline. Lotteries commenced in South Australia. Liquor trading hours extended. Torrens Island Power Station began operations. First stage of the South Eastern Freeway is opened.
1969: Natural gas pumped  from Moomba to Adelaide through the Moomba Adelaide Pipeline System. Glenelg Jetty rebuilt.

1970s
1970: South Australia becomes first state to reform abortion laws.
1971: Fluoridisation of water supply commenced. Age of majority reduced to 18 from 21.
1973: New hospital opened at Modbury. Dunstan Labor Government returned to Government and commenced extensive social reforms. Adelaide Festival Theatre opened.
1974: Prince Philip, The Duke of Edinburgh, visited Adelaide. First match of the new South Australian National Football League held at West Lakes. South Australian Railways split into two new entities, Australian National and State Transport Authority.
1975: The International Equestrian Exposition was held in Adelaide, attended by Princess Anne, The Princess Royal. The City of Adelaide Plan adopted by the City Council.
1976: 5AA began broadcasting. The Liberal Movement is founded in Adelaide. Rundle Mall, Australia's first pedestrian mall, opened between King William and Pulteney streets.
1977: Queen Elizabeth and Prince Philip visited Adelaide, with the Queen opening the Adelaide Festival Centre. Late night shopping commenced. First of 307 Volvo B59 buses enters service with State Transport Authority.
1978: Suburban rail network extended south to Noarlunga Centre while the Semaphore line is closed.

1980s
1980: Thirty-five homes destroyed in an Adelaide Hills bushfire. New 'Jumbo' railcars enter service on Adelaide's rail network. Mitsubishi Motors purchased Chrysler Australia. The Constitutional Museum opened.
1981: Prince Charles, The Prince of Wales, visited Adelaide.
1982: International air services to Adelaide begin, flown by Qantas and Singapore Airlines.  Coldest minimum temperature recorded in June ( -0.4° Celsius)
1983: The Prince and Princess of Wales visited Adelaide. The Ash Wednesday fires razed the Adelaide Hills, claiming twenty-eight lives throughout the state. Wendy Chapman elected the first woman Lord Mayor of Adelaide.
1984: Population of Adelaide reaches 1 million people. Keswick Railway Terminal opened. The Indian Pacific, Trans-Australian and The Ghan first run into Adelaide.
1985: The Adelaide Casino opened in the Adelaide railway station as part of the multimillion-dollar Adelaide Station and Environs Redevelopment. The first Australian Grand Prix held on the Adelaide Street Circuit. Queen Elizabeth 2 visits Adelaide for the first time.
1986: Queen Elizabeth II and Prince Philip visited Adelaide. Pope John Paul II visited Adelaide and held Mass to a gathering of hundreds of thousands in the Adelaide Parklands. The South Australian Maritime Museum opened. South Australia celebrated its Jubilee, 150 years since settlement. O-Bahn Busway is opened.
1987: The Collins class submarine contract awarded to the Australian Submarine Corporation at Outer Harbor. The Adelaide Convention Centre opened on North Terrace. New 3000 class railcars enter service on Adelaide's rail network.
1988: The Prince and Princess of Wales visited Adelaide. Adelaide's tallest building State Bank Building is opened. Red light cameras introduced. East End Markets closed. Australia's first hospitality college opened in Adelaide. Port Dock Railway Museum at Port Adelaide opened.
1989: Bicentennial Conservatory opened in the Botanic Gardens. O-Bahn Busway extended to Modbury.

1990s
1990: New $1.3 million organ installed at the Adelaide Town Hall. Adelaide recommended as a site for the Multi-Function Polis. Country rail passenger services from Adelaide are axed by Australian National.
1991: The University of South Australia formed from a merger of several institutions. The $40 million Adelaide Entertainment Centre opened. Dame Roma Mitchell becomes Governor of South Australia, the first woman to hold the position in any Australian state.
1992: Final marker to the 1.5 kilometre Heysen Walking Trail positioned. Bid for the 1998 Commonwealth Games lost to Kuala Lumpur.
1993: Poker machines installed for first time in South Australia.
1994: Sunday trading introduced to city centre. High-speed ferry service from Glenelg to Kangaroo Island began.
1995: United Water is contracted to manage Adelaide's water and sewerage systems. The Local Government (Boundary Reform) Act, 1995 passed to encourage municipal amalgamations, resulting in an overhaul of local government. The last Australian Grand Prix held in Adelaide, future events to be held in Melbourne.
1997: The world's longest reversible one way freeway, the Southern Expressway is opened. Adelaide Crows football club win the AFL Grand Final. Port Adelaide Football Club joins the Australian Football League.
1998: Adelaide Crows football club win the AFL Grand Final for the second time.
1999: First Tour Down Under held.

 2000s 

 2000s 
2000: All government bus operations handed to private operators, buses and infrastructure still government owned. Heysen Tunnels in Adelaide Hills are opened.
2001: Construction of Alice Springs-Darwin track starts. The National Wine Centre of Australia opens in the East Parklands.
2002: Queen Elizabeth II and Prince Philip visited Adelaide. First low floor bus entered service on the O-Bahn Busway.
2003: The transcontinental railway line from Adelaide to Darwin is completed.
2004: Port Adelaide Football Club wins the AFL Grand Final. Trains travel from Adelaide to Darwin for the first time.
2005: Adelaide Airport's new T1 terminal is opened. Port River Expressway opened.
2007: World Police and Fire Games held in Adelaide. Adelaide-Glenelg tram service is extended to North Terrace (City West).
2008: Record breaking heat wave set in March. Queen Elizabeth 2 visits Adelaide for the last time. Electrification of suburban rail network announced.
2009: Temperature reaches 45.7° Celsius on 30 January. Lance Armstrong Rides in the Tour Down Under

2010s
2010: Queen Victoria visits Adelaide for the first time on 23 February. Queen Mary 2 visits Adelaide for the first time on 11 March. Adelaide-Glenelg tram service extended to Adelaide Entertainment Centre. Northern Expressway constructed. Stephen Yarwood elected new Lord Mayor of Adelaide. Almost 70mm of rain falls on Adelaide on 7 December, breaking the daily record.
2011: Queen Mary 2'' visits Adelaide on 20 February.
2012: US Secretary of State Hillary Clinton visits Adelaide. Construction begins on South Road Superway. Emirates begins direct flights to Dubai on 1 November.
2013: South Australian Health and Medical Research Institute (SAHMRI) opened 29 November.
2014: Adelaide becomes the last mainland capital city to introduce electric trains with the A-City 4000 Class EMUs introduced on the Seaford line on 23 February

See also
History of Adelaide
List of Mayors and Lord Mayors of Adelaide

References

Further reading

 Timeline of Adelaide history
Timelines of cities in Australia
Adelaide-related lists
South Australian timelines